Mexico sent a delegation to compete at the 1980 Summer Paralympics in Arnhem, Netherlands. Its athletes finished ninth in the overall medal count.

Medalists

See also 
 1980 Summer Paralympics
 Mexico at the 1980 Summer Olympics

References 

Nations at the 1980 Summer Paralympics
1980
Summer Paralympics